Black Betsy is an unincorporated community in Putnam County, West Virginia, United States. The town is located on the east bank of the Kanawha River on West Virginia Route 62.

Many legends exist as to the origin of the name Black Betsy. Many claim it was named after a black woman who sold moonshine to miners while others say that "Black Betsy" was the moonshine itself. The coal from the area was supposedly named "Black Betsy" as well. All of these are rumors and each member of the community has a different variation of the story.

References 

Unincorporated communities in Putnam County, West Virginia
Unincorporated communities in West Virginia
Charleston, West Virginia metropolitan area
Populated places on the Kanawha River